Nam Ha National Protected Area is a national protected area in Luang Namtha Province in northern Laos. This mostly forested park is home to a variety of ethnic groups and diverse animal and plant species. The park is an ecotourism destination.

Geography

The park incorporates three rivers which drain into the Mekong: the Nam Tha, Nam Fa and Nam Long. The Nam Tha is the Mekong's first major tributary after entering Laos.

History
In 1980 Nam Ha was identified as a Provincial Protected Area. In 1993 Nam Ha National Protected Area was initially decreed to cover . In 2003 Nam Ha was designated an ASEAN Heritage Park, the only one in Laos. In 2006 the Nam Ha Ecotourism Project (a joint UNESCO–Lao project to sustainably manage the park) won the Equator Prize.

Flora and fauna
The park's main forest type is mixed secondary deciduous forest including secondary evergreen forest. At the park's lower elevations, in the Luang Namtha plain, human modification of the forest is evident and habitats include bamboo and scrub areas.

Animal species include Assam macaque, clouded leopard, gaur, tiger, elephant and a possibly unique species of muntjac. The frog species Amolops akhaorum is only known from the park. It is named for the local Akha people who helped with the fieldwork of the team who discovered the species in 2007.

The park is host to diverse bird species: about 300 species are recorded here. A few species are unique in Laos to Nam Ha: crested finchbill, white-bellied redstart and white-necked laughingthrush.

Threats
Nam Ha faces a number of environmental threats. The most significant is slash-and-burn agriculture. Harvesting of forest products, including timber, is also a threat. Hunting of wildlife is conducted by both residents and outsiders. Domesticated animals roam freely, disturbing wildlife and damaging wild habitats. Clearance of forested land for rubber plantations has occurred.

See also
Protected areas of Laos

References

National Biodiversity Conservation Areas
Protected areas established in 1993
Geography of Luang Namtha province
ASEAN heritage parks